The Juba dance or hambone, originally known as Pattin' Juba (Giouba, Haiti: Djouba), is an African-American style of dance that involves stomping as well as slapping and patting the arms, legs, chest, and cheeks (clapping). "Pattin' Juba" would be used to keep time for other dances during a walkaround. A Juba dance performance could include steps such as the "Jubal Jew", "Yaller Cat", "Pigeon Wing" and "Blow That Candle Out".

The dance traditionally ends with a step called the "Long Dog Scratch". Modern variations on the dance include Bo Diddley's "Bo Diddley Beat" and the step-shows of African American Greek organizations.

History of the dance

The Juba dance was originally brought by Kongo slaves to Charleston, South Carolina. It became an African-American plantation dance that was performed by slaves during their gatherings when no rhythm instruments were allowed due to fear of secret codes hidden in the drumming. The sounds were  used in the same manner as Yoruba and Haitian talking drums to communicate and relay information. The dance was performed in Dutch Guiana, the Caribbean, and the southern United States.

Later in the mid-19th century, music and lyrics were added, and there were public performances of the dance. Its popularization may have indirectly influenced the development of modern tap dance. The most famous Juba dancer was William Henry Lane, or Master Juba, one of the first black performers in the United States. It was often danced in minstrel shows, and is mentioned in songs such as "Christy's New Song" and "Juba", the latter by Nathaniel Dett.

In the 1930s and 1940s, African American composer Florence Price drew inspiration from juba when composing her symphonies.

Hambone was famously adopted and adapted in the 1950s by  rhythm & blues singer Bo Diddley for his "Bo Diddley beat", which was copied by many rock musicians.

Related songs
"Juba Juba", a popular song about the Juba:
Juba dis and Juba dat,
and Juba killed da yellow cat,
You sift the meal and ya gimme the husk,
you bake the bread and ya gimme the crust,
you eat the meat and ya gimme the skin,
and that's the way,
my mama's troubles begin

A song about the hambone from Step it Down (v.s.):
Hambone Hambone pat him on the shoulder
If you get a pretty girl, I'll show you how to hold her.
Hambone, Hambone, where have you been?
All 'round the world and back again.
Hambone, Hambone, what did you do?
I got a train and I fairly flew.
Hambone, Hambone where did you go?
I hopped up to Miss Lucy's door.
I asked Miss Lucy would she marry me.
(falsetto) "Well I don't care if Papa don't care!"
First come in was Mister Snake,
He crawled all over that wedding cake.
Next walked in was Mister Tick,
He ate so much it made him sick.
Next walked in was Mister Coon,
We asked him to sing us a wedding tune,
Now Ham-....
Now Ham....

See also

Charleston (dance)
Clogging
Hand jive
Jig
Jive (dance)
Master Juba
Minstrel show
Set de flo'
Step dance
Stick dance (African-American)
Tap dance
Schuhplattler

References

External links
"Hambone" at World Arts West
Juba / Giouba at StreetSwing
 "Jig, clog, and breakdown dancing made easy, with sketches of noted jig dancers", pub. by Ed. James

Wisconsin Badgers basketball coach Bo Ryan performs the hambone
Steve Hickman & Matthew Olwell perform tapping hambone
Interview with Steve Hickman on how to hambone
Hambone Hicks demonstrates the Hambone.
Great description of the description of jig dances along with other dances

African-American dance
Haitian dances
Dance terminology
Kongo culture